André Paul Henri Noël Lesauvage (25 December 1890 – 29 May 1971) was a French sailor who competed in the 1928 Summer Olympics.

In 1928 he was a crew member of the French boat l'Aile VI which won the gold medal in the 8 metre class.

References

External links
 
 
 
 

1890 births
1971 deaths
French male sailors (sport)
Olympic sailors of France
Sailors at the 1928 Summer Olympics – 8 Metre
Olympic gold medalists for France
Olympic medalists in sailing
Medalists at the 1928 Summer Olympics